Izúcar de Matamoros is a municipality in Puebla in south-eastern Mexico.

Settlements
For 1998 there were seven settlements listed for the Izúcar de Matamoros municipality, with some having more than one ejido.
Abelardo Rodriguez
San Isidro
Agua Escondida
Ayutla
Las Minas
Matzaco
Puctla (ejido)
 San Nicolás Tolentino (ejido)
San Pedro Calantla
Santiago Mihuacan (ejido)

References

Municipalities of Puebla
Populated places established in 1560